Andrew Tutt (born 21 February 1968) is a former English cricketer who played one first-class cricket match for Kent County Cricket Club in 1992. Tutt also captained the Kent Cricket Board side in List A cricket matches.

Tutt was born in Bermondsey in London in 1968. He played regularly for Kent's Second XI in 1992 and made his only senior appearance for the club against Cambridge University in June of that year. in the Kent Cricket League he played club cricket for Bromley, Bexley and Hartley Country Club and played in 10 List A matches for Kent Cricket Board in the NatWest Trophy and Cheltenham & Gloucester Trophy between 1999 and 2002, captaining the side in 1999 when they beat Denmark in the first round of the competition.

References

External links

1968 births
English cricketers
Living people
Kent cricketers
Kent Cricket Board cricketers